The Art of Tea is a jazz vocal album by Michael Franks, his first on Frank Sinatra's Reprise label, released in February 1976.

The album peaked at #131 on the Billboard 200. Franks's only Billboard Hot 100 single, "Popsicle Toes", which peaked at #43, is a track on the album

Track listing

Personnel
 Michael Franks – vocals
 Michael Brecker – saxophone
 David Sanborn – saxophone
 Joe Sample – keyboards
 Larry Bunker – vibraphone
 Larry Carlton – guitar
 Wilton Felder – bass guitar
 John Guerin – drums
 Jerry Steinholtz – congas

Technical
Mixing engineer – Al Schmitt
Recording engineers – Lee Hershbrook, Bruce Botnick, Al Schmitt
Mastering engineer: Doug Sax
Art direction and photography – Ed Thrasher

Charts

Certifications

References

Bibliography

Michael Franks (musician) albums

Albums produced by Tommy LiPuma
Reprise Records albums